The Game of Love is a 1924 German silent film directed by Guido Parish and starring Marcella Albani, Alfred Abel, and Carl de Vogt.

The film's sets were designed by the art director August Rinaldi.

Cast

References

Bibliography

External links

1924 films
Films of the Weimar Republic
German silent feature films
Films directed by Guido Parish
German black-and-white films
1920s German films